This is a list of the species of sepsid fly recorded in Europe.

Subfamily Orygmatinae Frey 1921
Genus Orygma Meigen, 1830
O. luctuosum Meigen, 1830

Subfamily Sepsinae Walker, 1833
Genus Ortalischema Frey 1925
O. albitarse (Zetterstedt, 1847)

Genus Zuskamira Pont, 1987
Z. inexpectata Pont, 1987

Genus Themira Robineau-Desvoidy, 1830
T. annulipes (Meigen, 1826)
T. arctica Becker in Becker, 1915
T. biloba Andersson, 1975
T. germanica Duda, 1926
T. gracilis (Zetterstedt, 1847)
T. leachi (Meigen, 1826)
T. lucida (Staeger in Schiødte, 1844)
T. malformans Melander & Spuler, 1917
T. minor (Haliday, 1833)
T. nigricornis (Meigen, 1826)
T. paludosa Elberg, 1963
T. pusilla (Zetterstedt, 1847)
T. putris (Linnaeus, 1758)
T. ringdahli Pont, 2002
T. sipmlicipes (Duda, 1926)
T. superba (Haliday, 1833)

Genus Susanomira Pont, 1987
S. caucasica Pont, 1987

Genus Meroplius Rondani, 1874
M. fukuharai (Iwasa, 1984)
M. minutus (Wiedemann, 1830)

Genus Saltella Robineau-Desvoidy, 1830  
S. nigripes  Robineau-Desvoidy, 1830
S. sphondylii (Schrank, 1803)

Genus Nemopoda Robineau-Desvoidy, 1830
N. nitidula (Fallén, 1820)
N. pectinulata Loew, 1873
N. speiseri (Duda, 1926)

Genus Sepsis Fallén, 1810
S. barbata Becker, 1907
S. biflexuosa Strobl, 1893
S. cynipsea (Linnaeus, 1758)
S. duplicata Haliday in Curtis, 1837
S. flavimana Meigen, 1826
S. fulgens Meigen, 1826
S. luteipes Melander & Spuler, 1917  
S. neocynipsea Melander & Spuler, 1917
S. nigripes Meigen, 1826
S. orthocnemis Frey, 1908
S. punctum (Fabricius, 1794)
S. thoracica (Robineau-Desvoidy, 1830)
S. violacea Meigen, 1826
S. fissa Becker, 1903
S. lateralis Wiedemann, 1830
S. niveipennis Becker, 1903
S. pseudomonostigma Ursu, 1969
S. setulosa (Duda, 1826)

References

Sepsidae
Diptera of Europe
 List Europe